Chefe Cobre is a village in Ancuabe District in Cabo Delgado Province in northeastern Mozambique.

References 

Populated places in Ancuabe District